Joyce Ann Fitzpatrick (born November 24, 1942) is an American from Maine. A Republican, Fitzpatrick represented the town of Houlton, Aroostook County, Maine in the Maine House of Representatives. She was first elected in 2010 and served until 2014. During the 126th Legislature (2013–14), Fitzpatrick served as the ranking minority member on the insurance and financial services committee.

References

1942 births
Living people
People from Houlton, Maine
Republican Party members of the Maine House of Representatives
Ricker College alumni
Women state legislators in Maine
21st-century American women